Snäckö is the name of three locations in Finland:
an island in Kumlinge, Åland
an island in Nago, Åboland
a village in Geta, Åland